Piso pisello (internationally released as Sweet Pea) is a 1981 Italian comedy-drama film directed by Peter Del Monte. 
It entered the 38th Venice International Film Festival.

Cast 
Luca Porro: Oliviero 
Fabio Peraboni: Cristiano 'Pisello' 
Valeria D'Obici: Mother
Alessandro Haber: Father
Victoria Gadsden: May 
Piero Mazzarella: Bamba 
Eros Pagni: Corazza 
Leopoldo Trieste: The wanderer

References

External links

1981 films
1980s Italian-language films
Films set in Milan
Films directed by Peter Del Monte
Italian comedy-drama films
1981 comedy-drama films
Films scored by Fiorenzo Carpi
1980s Italian films